Bad Hönningen is a Verbandsgemeinde ("collective municipality") in the district of Neuwied, in Rhineland-Palatinate, Germany. The seat of the Verbandsgemeinde is in Bad Hönningen.

The Verbandsgemeinde Bad Hönningen consists of the following Ortsgemeinden ("local municipalities"):

 Bad Hönningen
 Hammerstein 
 Leutesdorf 
 Rheinbrohl

Verbandsgemeinde in Rhineland-Palatinate